Higher Institute of Applied Languages, Moknine (Arabic: المعهد العالي للغات المطبقة , بالمكنين) or ISLAM is a Tunisian university founded in 2004 under the University of Monastir

Universities in Tunisia
Education in Tunisia
Educational organisations based in Tunisia
Educational institutions established in 2004
2004 establishments in Tunisia